Eric Madsen is an American baseball coach and former player. He played college baseball at Eastern Utah from 1991 to 1992 before transferring to Southern Utah. He then served as the head coach of the Eastern Utah Golden Eagles (1997–2003) and Utah Valley Wolverines (2009–2021). Madsen took Utah Valley to its first NCAA Regional in 2016 and during his career has amassed a record of 305–357

Playing career
Madsen graduated from Bonneville High School in Idaho Falls, Idaho where he lettered in three sports.  In baseball, he was a three year starter, earned all-City honors twice, and was named Athlete of the Year in his senior season as a pitcher and infielder.  He attended Eastern Utah for two seasons then completed his eligibility at Southern Utah.

Coaching career
After his playing days ended in the 1994 season, Madsen returned to Eastern Utah as an assistant coach.  After two seasons, he was elevated to the top post.  In his seven seasons guiding the Golden Eagles, he coached future MLB pitcher Willie Eyre.  After completing his degree at Bellevue University, Madsen became an assistant at Utah Valley, his first four-year coaching position.  During his five seasons as a Wolverines assistant, he coached several future professionals, including Kam Mickolio, the first Utah Valley product to reach MLB.  In 2009, Madsen became head coach and guided the Wolverines through the final stages of their upgrade to Division I, which was completed in 2010.  The Wolverines won the first three Great West Conference regular season and Tournament championships, including a 28–0 regular season in 2012.  In that same season, the Wolverines were nationally ranked for the first time in school history, held the nation's longest winning streak at 32 games, led the nation in several offensive categories, and recorded the most wins in Division I prior to the NCAA Tournament.  Despite this resume, the Wolverines were not invited to compete in the tournament.  In 2014, Madsen guided the Wolverines into the Western Athletic Conference. On April 27, 2021, Madsen resigned as the head coach of the Wolverines.

Head coaching record
This table reflects Madsen's record as a head coach at the Division I level.

References

External links
Eric Madsen, Head Baseball Coach Utah Valley University Wolverines

Living people
Bellevue University alumni
Utah State Eastern Golden Eagles baseball coaches
Utah State Eastern Golden Eagles baseball players
Southern Utah Thunderbirds baseball players
Utah Valley Wolverines baseball coaches
Year of birth missing (living people)